Air Transat Flight 236 was a transatlantic flight bound for Lisbon, Portugal, from Toronto, Canada, that lost all engine power while flying over the Atlantic Ocean on August 24, 2001. The Airbus A330 ran out of fuel due to a fuel leak caused by improper maintenance. Captain Robert Piché, 48, an experienced glider pilot, and First Officer Dirk DeJager, 28, glided the plane to a successful emergency landing in the Azores, saving all 306 people (293 passengers and 13 crew) on board. Most of the passengers on the flight were Canadians visiting Europe or Portuguese expatriates returning to visit family in Portugal. Following this unusual aviation accident, this aircraft was nicknamed the "Azores Glider".

Incident
Flight TS 236 took off from Toronto at 00:52 (UTC) on Friday, August 24, 2001 (local time: 20:52 (ET) on Thursday, August 23), bound for Lisbon, Portugal, with 293 passengers and 13 crew on board. The flight was flown by Captain Robert Piché, who had 16,800 hours of flight experience (with 796 of them on the Airbus A330), and First Officer Dirk DeJager, who had 4,800 flight hours (including 386 hours on the Airbus A330). The aircraft was a two-year-old Airbus A330-243 registered as  that first flew on March 17, 1999, configured with 362 seats and placed in service by Air Transat on April 28, 1999. It was powered by two Rolls-Royce Trent 772B-60 engines capable of delivering  thrust each. Leaving the gate in Toronto, the aircraft had 46.9 tonnes of fuel on board, 4.5 tonnes more than required by regulations.

At 04:38 UTC (almost four hours into the flight), the aircraft began to leak fuel through a fracture that had developed in a fuel line to the no. 2 (right) engine. At 05:03 UTC, more than four hours into the flight, the pilots noticed low oil temperature and high oil pressure on engine no. 2. Although these readings were an indirect result of the fuel leak, the pilots had no reason  to consider that as a cause. Consequently, Captain Piché suspected they were false warnings and shared that opinion with Air Transat maintenance control centre in Montreal, which advised them to monitor the situation.

At 05:36 UTC, the pilots received a warning of fuel imbalance. Still unaware of the fuel leak, they followed a standard procedure to remedy the imbalance by transferring fuel from the left wing tank to the right wing tank. The transferred fuel was lost through the fractured fuel line, which was leaking at about one gallon per second. This caused a higher-than-normal fuel flow through the fuel-oil heat exchanger, which in turn led to a drop in oil temperature and a rise in oil pressure for the no. 2 engine.

At 05:45 UTC, the pilots decided to divert to Lajes Air Base in the Azores. They declared a fuel emergency with Santa Maria Oceanic air traffic control three minutes later.

Ten minutes later, the crew sent a mayday to Santa Maria Oceanic air traffic control.

Without engine power, the plane lost its primary source of electrical power. The emergency ram air turbine deployed automatically to provide essential power for critical sensors and flight instruments to fly the aircraft as well as enough hydraulic pressure to operate the primary flight controls (without which the aircraft would be uncontrollable). The aircraft lost hydraulic power for the flaps, alternate brakes, and spoilers. The slats would still be powered, while the primary brakes would be able to operate a limited number of times using pressure stored in the brake accumulator. Five minutes later, at 06:31 UTC, the oxygen masks dropped down in the passenger cabin.

Military air traffic controllers guided the aircraft to the airport with their radar system. They calculated they had about 15 to 20 minutes left before they would be forced to ditch in the ocean. The air base was sighted a few minutes later. Piché executed one 360° turn, and then a series of "S" turns, to dissipate excess altitude.

Maximum emergency braking was applied and retained, and the plane came to a stop after a landing run that consumed  of the  runway. Because the antiskid and brake modulation systems were inoperative, the eight main wheels locked up, the tires abraded and fully deflated within , and the wheels themselves were worn down to the axle journals during rollout.

Fourteen passengers and two crew members had minor injuries, while two passengers had serious injuries during the evacuation of the aircraft. The plane suffered structural damage to the main landing gear (due to the hard touchdown and the abrasion of the locked wheels against the runway surface during the landing roll) and the lower fuselage (both structural deformation from the hard touchdown and various punctures from impact by pieces of debris shed from the main landing gear).

Investigation
The Portuguese Aviation Accidents Prevention and Investigation Department (GPIAA) investigated the accident along with Canadian and French authorities.

The investigation revealed that the cause of the accident was a fuel leak in the no. 2 engine, caused by an incorrect part installed in the hydraulics system by Air Transat maintenance staff as part of routine maintenance. The engine had been replaced with a spare engine, lent by Rolls-Royce, from an older model which did not include a hydraulic pump. Despite the lead mechanic's concerns, Air Transat authorized the use of a part from a similar engine, an adaptation that did not maintain adequate clearance between the hydraulic lines and the fuel line. This lack of clearance, on the order of millimetres from the intended part, allowed chafing between the lines to rupture the fuel line, causing the leak.

Pilot error was also listed as one of the lead causes of the accident (for failing to identify the fuel leak, neglecting to shut down cross-feed after the first engine flamed out, and failing to follow standard operating procedures in possibly more than one case). Nevertheless, the pilots returned to a heroes' welcome from the Canadian press as a result of their successful unpowered landing. In 2002, Captain Piché was awarded the Superior Airmanship Award by the Air Line Pilots' Association.

Aftermath 

Following the accident investigation, the French Directorate General for Civil Aviation (DGCA) issued F-2002-548B, requiring a detailed fuel-leak procedure in the flight manual and the need for crews to be aware of this. This was later cancelled and replaced by F-2005-195. The US Federal Aviation Administration (FAA) issued AD 2006-02-01, effective February 3, 2006, requiring new airplane flight manual procedures to follow in the event of a fuel leak for Airbus Model A330 and A340 aircraft.

The accident led to the DGCA and FAA issuing an airworthiness directive (AD), requiring all operators of Airbus models A318, A319, A320 and A321 narrow-body aircraft to revise their flight manuals, stressing that crews should check that any fuel imbalance is not caused by a fuel leak before opening the cross-feed valve. The AD required all airlines operating these Airbus models to make revisions to the flight manuals before any further flights were allowed. The FAA gave a 15-day grace period before enforcing the AD. Airbus also modified its computer systems; the on-board computer now checks all fuel levels against the flight plan. It now gives a clear warning if fuel is being expended beyond the specified fuel consumption rate of the engines. Rolls-Royce also issued a bulletin advising of the incompatibility of the relevant engine parts.

The aircraft was repaired and returned to service with Air Transat in December 2001, with the nickname "Azores Glider".  It was placed into storage in March 2020 due to COVID-19 pandemic. On October 18, 2021, the aircraft made its last flight with Air Transat and was subsequently returned to the lessor AerCap. The aircraft was re-registered as N271AD and stored at Pinal Airpark. The future use of the aircraft is unknown.

Related study
Margaret McKinnon, a postdoctoral psychology student at Baycrest Health Sciences in Toronto at the time, was a passenger on her honeymoon on Flight 236. She and her colleagues recruited 15 other passengers in a study of post-traumatic stress disorder (PTSD), published in August 2014 in the academic journal Clinical Psychological Science, which compared details recalled by passengers with PTSD with those recalled by passengers without PTSD and with a control group.

In popular culture
 The events of Flight 236 were featured in "Flying on Empty", a season-one (2003) episode of the Canadian TV series Mayday (called Air Emergency and Air Disasters in the U.S. and Air Crash Investigation in the UK and elsewhere around the world). The flight was also included in a Mayday sixth season (2007) Science of Disaster special titled "Who's Flying the Plane?" 
 MSNBC produced a report on the incident with the title "On a Wing and a Prayer", which first aired in the U.S. on August 7, 2005.
 The story of Robert Piché is depicted in the 2010 French Canadian biographical drama film Piché: The Landing of a Man culminating with the events on Flight 236. Captain Piché is portrayed by both Genie Award-winning actor Michel Côté and his son Maxime LeFlaguais.

See also

US Airways Flight 1549, the "Miracle on the Hudson" – glided after both engines disabled by a bird strike
Air Canada Flight 143, the "Gimli Glider" – glided after running out of fuel
TACA Flight 110 – glided after water ingestion in both engines in a storm
List of airline flights that required gliding

Notes

References

External links
Accident Investigation Final Report from the Portuguese Aviation Accidents Prevention and Investigation Department (Archive, Archive #2, Alternate Link)
Report profile 
"Air Transat Flight TS 236 of August 24, 2001 – Air Transat welcomes investigation findings and recommendations" (Archive Archive #2). Air Transat. October 17, 2004.

News report on logistical issues after the incident
"Grateful passengers praise Air Transat pilot." CBC News. Sunday August 26, 2001.
Captain Robert Piché's Official Website 
PTSD clues gleaned from passengers on terrifying flight
This plane RAN OUT of FUEL in the middle of the OCEAN!! on YouTube

Flight 236
Aviation accidents and incidents in 2001
Aviation accidents and incidents in Portugal
Airliner accidents and incidents caused by fuel exhaustion
Airliner accidents and incidents caused by mechanical failure
Airliner accidents and incidents caused by maintenance errors
Airliner accidents and incidents caused by pilot error
Accidents and incidents involving the Airbus A330
August 2001 events in Europe
2001 in Portugal
Canada–Portugal relations
2001 disasters in Portugal